LeVert was an American R&B vocal group from Cleveland, Ohio, United States. Formed in 1983, LeVert was composed of Sean and Gerald Levert (sons of Eddie Levert, founder and lead singer of R&B/Soul vocal group O'Jays) and Marc Gordon.

Biography
The group released their first single, "I'm Still", for Harry Coombes's Tempre label. In 1985, they released their debut album, I Get Hot, which included tracks whose vocals drew strong comparisons to Sean and Gerald Levert's father Eddie. Bloodline followed in 1986, and this album included the band's first big R&B hit "(Pop, Pop, Pop, Pop) Goes My Mind", a track that went all the way to Number One. However, the band's next album, 1987's The Big Throwdown became an even bigger success, on the strength of the Number One R&B hit "Casanova", which gave them a crossover hit on the pop chart (number 5) and also a UK Top 10.

A pair of additional R&B Top Five singles were also released from this album: "My Forever Love" and "Sweet Sensation". The band's success continued with their 1988 follow-up album Just Coolin', which was nominated for Best R&B/Urban Contemporary Album for the 1989 Soul Train Music Awards. Both The Big Throwdown and Just Coolin''' received gold certification. Beginning in the 1990s, Gerald began dividing his time between LeVert, and his solo career, but the band went on to release three more albums, and Rhino Records released a greatest hits album in 2001.

Gerald died of a heart attack in November 2006.Sean Levert died in March 2008.

Discography

Studio albums
 I Get Hot (1985)
 Bloodline (1986)
 The Big Throwdown (1987)
 Just Coolin' (1988)
 Rope a Dope Style (1990) 
 For Real Tho' (1993)
 The Whole Scenario'' (1997)

References

External links

LeVert II 2011 Audio Interview at Soulinterviews.com

American contemporary R&B musical groups
New jack swing music groups
African-American musical groups
Musical groups from Cleveland
Atlantic Records artists
Rhino Records artists